Phymorhynchus major is a species of sea snail, a marine gastropod mollusk in the family Raphitomidae.

Description
The length of the shell attains 72 mm.

Distribution
This species was found on the East Pacific Rise at a depth of 2,500 m.

References

 Warén A. & Bouchet P. (2001). Gastropoda and Monoplacophora from hydrothermal vents and seeps new taxa and records. The Veliger, 44(2): 116-231

External links
 

major
Gastropods described in 2001